Basta Sports is a Philippine informative sports program created by the ABS-CBN Foundation (formerly ABS-CBN Lingkod Kapamilya Foundation) and airs weekly on ABS-CBN. It features different sports and sports icons.

The show hosted by Atom Araullo and Ketchup Eusebio, Basta Sports is a unique show about games and sports for today's youth. Produced by ABS-CBN Foundation, the show presents a particular sports' history, its mechanics and also teaches kids how to be active and healthy through participation in said sports. It is directed by Rene Guidote.

References

See also
List of programs previously aired by ABS-CBN

2006 Philippine television series debuts
2006 Philippine television series endings
ABS-CBN original programming
Filipino-language television shows
Philippine children's television series
Philippine sports television series